The Wolfsnächte Tour 2015 was a European concert tour by German power metal band Powerwolf. Supporting the release of their sixth studio album Blessed & Possessed, the tour ran from 3 September 2015 to 7 November 2015, taking place in Switzerland, Germany, Netherlands, United Kingdom, France, Hungary, Austria, Czech Republic and Belgium.

Background 
Powerwolf's sixth album Blessed & Possessed was released on 17 July 2015. The tour was announced shortly after the release of the album. Orden Ogan, Xandria and Civil War were selected to serve a series of opening acts for Powerwolf during the tour. The tour was set to begin on 3 September 2015 at the Z7 in Pratteln, Switzerland. It was set to end on 7 November 2015 at the Garage in the band's hometown Saarbrücken.

Powerwolf released the Wolfsnächte 2015 Tour EP, a split EP with Orden Ogan, Xandria, and Civil War. This EP featured a previously unreleased Powerwolf track, "Stronger than the Sacrament". Copies of this EP were originally distributed along with the purchase of tickets to the tour.

Set list 
This setlist is representative of the show on 25 October 2015 in Budapest, Hungary, at the Barba Negra Music Club. It does not represent all dates throughout the tour.

 "Lupus Daemonis"
 "Blessed & Possessed"
 "Coleus Sanctus"
 "Amen & Attack"
 "Cardinal Sin"
 "Army of the Night"
 "Resurrection by Erection"
 "Armata Strigoi"
 Drum solo
 "Dead Boys Don't Cry"
 "Let There Be Night"
 "Werewolves of Armenia"
 "In the Name of God (Deus Vult)"
 "We Drink Your Blood"
 "Lupus Dei"
 "Opening: Prelude to Purgatory"
 "Opening: Agnus Dei'
 "Sanctified With Dynamite"
 "Kreuzfeuer"
 "All We Need Is Blood"
 "Wolves Against the World"

Tour dates

Notes

References

External links 
 Official Powerwolf website

2015 concert tours
Powerwolf concert tours
Concert tours of Europe
Concert tours of Germany
Concert tours of France
Concert tours of the United Kingdom